The 2012 Slovak Open was a professional tennis tournament played on indoor hard courts. It was the 13th edition of the tournament which was part of the 2012 ATP Challenger Tour. It took place in Bratislava, Slovakia between 5 and 11 November 2012.

Singles main-draw entrants

Seeds

 1 Rankings are as of October 29, 2012.

Other entrants
The following players received wildcards into the singles main draw:
  Norbert Gomboš
  Filip Horanský
  Jozef Kovalík
  Kamil Čapkovič

The following players received entry as an alternate into the singles main draw:
  Andrej Martin

The following players received entry from the qualifying draw:
  Andre Begemann
  Riccardo Bellotti
  Miloslav Mečíř Jr.
  Michal Mertiňák

Champions

Singles

 Lukáš Rosol swd.  Björn Phau, 6–7(3–7), 7–6(7–5), 7–5(8–6)

Doubles

 Lukáš Dlouhý /  Mikhail Elgin def.  Philipp Marx /  Florin Mergea, 6–7(5–7), 6–2, [10–6]

External links
Official Website

Slovak Open
Slovak Open
Slovak Open
Slovak Open